The hairy-tailed bat (Lasiurus ebenus), is a bat species originally known only from its type locality, Ilha do Cardoso State Park in Brazil. A second specimen was collected in 2018, in Carlos Botelho State Park, approximately 100 kilometers away.

References

Lasiurus
Bats of Brazil
Endemic fauna of Brazil
Mammals described in 1994